The Théniet El Had National Park is one of the 10 national parks of Algeria. It is located in Tissemsilt Province, named after Théniet El Haâd, a town near this park.

Description
It has several forests, and it is located in the foothills of the highest peak (1.985 meter/ 6.512 feet high) of the Ouarsenis mountain chain in the Tell Atlas; home to a diversified flora and fauna. The park is a popular hiking destination for many Algerians.

Seventeen species of mammals live in the park, nine of which are protected, also 27 bird species live here, of which 60% are actively breeding here.

References

External links
 Official Website
 Official website 

Park data on UNEP-WPMC

National parks of Algeria
Tourist attractions in Tissemsilt Province
Protected areas established in 1983
Geography of Tissemsilt Province
1983 establishments in Algeria